{{DISPLAYTITLE:Tau2 Hydrae}}

Tau2 Hydrae is a probable astrometric binary star system in the equatorial constellation of Hydra. Based upon an annual parallax shift of 6.30 mas as seen from Earth, it is located around 520 light years from the Sun. The brighter component is visible to the naked eye with an apparent visual magnitude of +4.56.

The primary member, component A, is an A-type main sequence star with a stellar classification of A3 V. It is a suspected variable of unknown type, with an amplitude of 0.06 in visual magnitude. The star has around 4.5 times the radius of the Sun and is radiating about 285 times the solar luminosity from its photosphere at an effective temperature of 7,918 K.

References

A-type main-sequence stars
Suspected variables
Hydrae, Tau
Hydra (constellation)
Hydrae, 32
082446
046776
3787
Durchmusterung objects
Astrometric binaries
Uḳdah II